In Greek mythology, Aergia ('inactivity') is the personification of sloth, idleness, indolence and laziness. She is the translation of the Latin Socordia, or Ignavia. She was translated to Greek because Hyginus mentioned her based on a Greek source, and thus can be considered as both a Greek and Roman goddess. Aergia's opposite character is Horme, a goddess of effort.

Family 
Aergia was the daughter of the primordial deities Aether and Gaia.

 "From Aether (Air) and Terra/ Gaia (Earth) [were born]: Dolor (Pain), Dolus (Guile), Ira/ Lyssa (Anger), Luctus/ Penthus (Lamentation), Mendacium/ Pseudologoi (Lies), Jusjurandum/ Horcus (Oath), Ultio/ Poine (Vengeance), Intemperantia (Intemperance), Altercatio/ Amphillogiai (Altercation), Oblivio/ Lethe (Forgetfulness), Socordia/ Aergia (Sloth), Timor/ Phobos (Fear), Superbia (Arrogance), Incestum (Sacrilege), Pugna/ Hysminai (Combat)."

Mythology 
According to Statius, Aergia was said to be the 'torpid' guard in the court of Hypnos (Sleep) in the Underworld.

 "In] the hollow recesses of a deep and rocky cave . . . [are] set the halls of lazy Somnus/ Hypnos (Sleep) and his untroubled dwelling. The threshold is guarded by shady Quies/ ?Hesychia (Quiet) and dull Oblivio/ Lethe (Forgetfulness) and torpid Ignavia/ Aergia (Sloth) with ever drowsy countenance. Otia/ Acratus (Ease) and Silentia/ ?Hesychia (Silence) with folded wings sit mute in the forecourt. . ."

Notes

References 

 Gaius Julius Hyginus, Fabulae from The Myths of Hyginus translated and edited by Mary Grant. University of Kansas Publications in Humanistic Studies. Online version at the Topos Text Project.
 Publius Papinius Statius, The Thebaid translated by John Henry Mozley. Loeb Classical Library Volumes. Cambridge, MA, Harvard University Press; London, William Heinemann Ltd. 1928. Online version at the Topos Text Project.
 Publius Papinius Statius, The Thebaid. Vol I-II. John Henry Mozley. London: William Heinemann; New York: G.P. Putnam's Sons. 1928. Latin text available at the Perseus Digital Library.

Greek goddesses
Personifications in Greek mythology
Children of Gaia